Donovan Chapman (born in Farmerville, Louisiana) is an American country music artist. he has recorded two studio albums: one on Curb Records, and one on Category 5 Records. He has also charted four singles on the Billboard Hot Country Songs charts, with his highest being the No. 42-peaking "House Like That" in late 2006-early 2007.

Biography
Chapman was raised in Farmerville, Louisiana. His mother, a native of Hawaii, exposed him to Hawaiian music at an early age, and he soon learned to play the ukulele.

At age seventeen, Chapman enlisted in the United States Air Force. He spent eleven years in the Air Force, serving for five years in U.S. Air Force Security Forces and six years as a Pararescueman. During his leave time, he met Mike Curb, head of the Curb Records label, and was soon signed to the label.

Chapman's first single, "There Is No War", was released in 2003. The single was dedicated to families of American soldiers who had died overseas. Chapman recorded two albums for Curb Records, shortly before returning to duty in Afghanistan. In the same time, Chapman released a self titled EP, followed by his first full album, I Am America.

After returning to the United States, he signed to Category 5 Records. His first single for Category 5, "House Like That", was released in late 2006. A second single, "All I Need", was released in 2007, shortly before Chapman terminated his relationship with Category 5 Records. "House Like That" was produced by Billy Joe Walker, Jr.

Chapman's music career went into hiatus after he suffered from post traumatic stress disorder stemming from his service in the Air Force. After recovering, he released the album Brotherhood in late 2021.

Discography

Studio albums

Extended plays

Singles

References

Year of birth missing (living people)
Living people
People from Farmerville, Louisiana
American country singer-songwriters
Country musicians from Louisiana
American ukulele players
Curb Records artists
United States Air Force airmen
Singer-songwriters from Louisiana
American people of Native Hawaiian descent